Rīgas Balss was a tabloid newspaper published in Riga, Latvia, published in Latvian and Russian languages. The Russian edition has turned into Vechernyaya Riga in 2001 and ceased publication in 2004. Latvian edition has turned into journal in 2008 and ceased publication in 2009.

References

External links

The first issue of the Russian-language edition, 1957

1957 establishments in the Soviet Union
2009 disestablishments in Latvia
Latvian-language newspapers
Defunct newspapers published in Latvia
Defunct daily newspapers
Russian-language newspapers published in Latvia
Mass media in Riga
Publications established in 1957
Publications disestablished in 2009
1957 establishments in Latvia
Newspapers published in the Soviet Union